Geraldo Pereira de Matos Filho (born 27 January 1953), nicknamed Mazarópi, is a Brazilian professional football coach and former player who manages SER Santo Ângelo.

A goalkeeper, he holds the world record for the longest time without conceding a goal, with 1,816 minutes.

Career

Club career
Mazarópi played for Vasco da Gama, Coritiba, Grêmio, Náutico, Figueirense and Guarany de Bagé.

International career
Mazarópi earned one cap for the Brazil national football team.

Coaching career
Mazarópi has coached Nagoya Grampus, Sapucaiense, Vilhena and Guarani (VA).

Managerial statistics

References

External links

1953 births
Living people
Brazilian footballers
Sportspeople from Minas Gerais
Coritiba Foot Ball Club players
CR Vasco da Gama players
Grêmio Foot-Ball Porto Alegrense players
Clube Náutico Capibaribe players
Figueirense FC players
Guarani FC players
Brazil international footballers
Brazilian football managers
J1 League managers
Nagoya Grampus managers
Expatriate football managers in Japan
Vilhena Esporte Clube managers
Association football goalkeepers